In underground mining, a raise refers to a vertical or inclined excavation that leads from one level, or drift, to another.  A raise may also extend to surface.  There are four excavation methods for raises:
Conventional or open raise
Long-hole or drop raise
Alimak
Raise boring

Raises serve a number of purposes including:
Transportation of ore and waste rock
Ventilation
Creating a free face for mining
Movement of workers via manway ladders

References

Underground mining